Veshareh (also Romanized as Veshāreh) is a village in Manzariyeh Rural District, in the Central District of Shahreza County, Isfahan Province, Iran. At the 2006 census, its population was 488, in 150 families.

References 

Populated places in Shahreza County